Douglas Lake or Lake Douglas is the name of several different lakes:

United States
Douglas Lake (Alabama)
Douglas Lake (Alaska)
Douglas Lake (Georgia)
Douglas Lake (Illinois)
Douglas Lake (Kansas)
Douglas Lake (Kentucky)
Douglas Lake (Cheboygan County, Michigan) 
Douglas Lake (Otsego County, Michigan), Otsego County, Michigan
Douglas Lake (Minnesota)
Douglas Lake (Clay County, Mississippi), Clay County, Mississippi
Douglas Lake (Lafayette County, Mississippi), Lafayette County, Mississippi
Douglas Lake (Missouri)
Douglas Lake (North Dakota)
Douglas Lake (Oregon)
Douglas Lake, Tennessee
Douglas Lake (West Virginia) 
Douglas Lake (Wisconsin)
Lake Douglas (Lake County, Florida), Lake County, Florida
Lake Douglas (Orange County, Florida), Orange County, Florida
Lake Douglas (Georgia)
Lake Douglas (Montana)
Lake Douglas (South Dakota)

Canada
Douglas Lake, British Columbia - see Douglas Lake Airport

New Zealand
Douglas Lake (New Zealand), glacial lake at the terminus of the Douglas Glacier